is a mountain in the Ushirotateyama Mountains in the Hida Mountains. The mountain body straddles Kurobe, Toyama and Ōmachi, Nagano, and the summit is mostly located on the Toyama side. It is one of the 100 Famous Japanese Mountains. It is sometimes written as Goryu-dake with only "dragon" in the old font.

References

External links

Goryu
Goryu